Rajnigandha Shekhawat is a popular singer from  Rajasthan and the Princess of the estrwhile state of Malsisar Rajasthan, India, she is known for singing Rajasthani folk, Bollywood, English + Rajasthani Marwari mashups, vintage classics and more. She has done playbacks in 7 films – her biggest song to date is Dharma Productions' Badri ki dulhania with over 650 million views, which opens with her voice. Rajnigandha's voice was heard in one of this season's So you think you can dance' reality show episodes in the US. She has been nominated for a Mirchi Award for Most Promising New Singer in 2017 for the film Shubh Mangal Savdhan. She was recently invited to participate in the reality singing show Rising Star on Colors TV and also performed at the Big Boss finale which is the Indian version of Big Brother.

Rajnigandha Shekhawat is the only singer who does Rajasthani folk + English mashups. Two of her videos have become viral hits on Facebook videos, making her the most recognized face of fusion Rajasthani music. The Rajasthani press now refers to her as the "MahaRani of Mashups." Her mashups of Cheap Thrills with Ghoomar shot her to fame and her subsequent Mashups of Shape of you and Single Ladies, with Rajasthani folk songs have been very popular.

Belonging to the erstwhile  Aristocratic family of Malsisar, in the Jaipur state, Rajnigandha broke barriers of her class and caste to follow her passion against all odds  to become the first ever singer from the very traditional and conservative Rajput community of Rajasthan and today she is one of the more renowned singers of the state.

She's released 3 albums and sung in over 500 concerts worldwide including Sun City, South Africa and Global Village, Dubai, Muscat and more . She has sung various popular jingles like Fanta for Amit Trivedi, Jabong Diwali, Lenovo, Rajasthan Tourism logo reveal and her most recent releases are the new anthem for Indian Idol 10 called "Mausam Music Ka" and the new Red FM jingle .

Shekhawat is a Bollywood marketing professional, having worked in Disney India, Times of India (Times Music) and has been associated with actor Shahid Kapoor in a managerial capacity. A classically trained singer having done Visharad from Bhathkhande University and Masters in Hindustani Classical Music for SNDT University, Mumbai, she currently divides her time between touring for concerts, bollywood playback recordings and her personal video shoots.

Discography

Awards 
 Nominated for Upcoming Female Vocalist at Mirchi Awards year 2017 for her song Kankad in the film Shubh Mangal Savdhan
 Best Female – Artist Aloud Award 2011
 Rajasthan Sangeet Ratna
DNA Woman of Substance, Rajasthan 
Best Fusion Song award in the Non Film Music category at the Jaipur Music Festival awards 2017

References 

Indian women folk singers
Indian folk singers
Women musicians from Rajasthan
Singers from Rajasthan
21st-century Indian women singers
21st-century Indian singers